Elachista imatrella is a moth of the family Elachistidae which is endemic to Finland.

The forewing ground colour of the females is mottled greyish/brownish from the base to the fascia and blackish beyond. For males, the ground colour of the forewings is greyish brown, with whitish scales basally, resulting in a mottled appearance.

The larvae possibly feed on Carex species, probably Carex vaginata. They mine the leaves of their host plant.

References

imatrella
Moths described in 1971
Endemic fauna of Finland
Moths of Europe